J. Clifford Hudson (born 1954, Dallas) is an American business executive best known for serving as chairman of the board and chief executive officer of Oklahoma City-based Sonic Corp. He also served as a trustee of the Ford Foundation and is a past chairman of the board of the National Trust for Historic Preservation.

Personal life
Hudson is a graduate of the University of Oklahoma and Georgetown University Law Center. He is married to Leslie Hudson, a public health professional and former associate professor at the University of Oklahoma, with whom he has two sons. In his spare time, he has been a member of the Sonic Tones, an eight-member band made up of senior executives of the Sonic Corporation, which competed in the 2003 Battle of the Corporate Bands at the Rock and Roll Hall of Fame and Museum in Cleveland, Ohio.

Career
After graduating from law school and several years as a practicing attorney, he was hired as the head of the legal department for Sonic Corp in 1984. He became president and chief executive officer in 1995, and was named chairman in January 2000. During his tenure, the company grew from a nationwide total of 1,428 locations in 1995 to more than 3,500 today, with locations in 45 of the 50 US states. In addition, average drive-in sales have increased by 65% and system-wide sales from $880 million to $4.5 billion. The company's enterprise value grew from approximately $200 million to more than $2.3 billion, when it was acquired by Inspire Brands in 2018.

Master of None
Since his departure from Sonic Corp. in early 2019, Cliff has been sharing his philosophy on becoming a “Master of None”.  In February 2019, he was the James R. Wilson annual guest lecturer at The College of Wooster (Ohio) where he unveiled plans to release a book on the topic.   Over the last two years, he has been working on this, his first book, entitled Master of None - How a Jack-of-All-Trades Can Still Reach the Top.  This personal story of his lifelong development of leadership skills challenges established thinking, offering counter-intuitive career advice essential to professionals at all levels, for the person just starting out or in the middle of their career.  Publishing house HarperCollins is set to release Master of None in October 2020.

Master of None offers a different way forward, to help businesses and professionals thrive at all levels.  One key take-away is that it's okay to embrace life as a master of none, being comfortable with potentiality and variety, allowing yourself to thrive in unfamiliar environments, and seizing opportunities that you didn't see coming. Above all, Master of None calls the reader to appreciate that flexibility and adaptation is the foundation for success in work and in life.

Philanthropy
Hudson was a member of the board of trustees of the Ford Foundation from 2005 to 2017 and is a past chairman of the National Trust for Historic Preservation. He is past chairman of Georgetown University Law Center's Board of Visitors and has served as chairman of the Oklahoma City Public School Board of Education. In 1994, he was appointed by President Bill Clinton to serve as chairman of the Board of the Securities Investor Protection Corporation, and served until 2001. In addition to this he has served on numerous boards related to Oklahoma City including MAPS for Kids—a $700 million school revitalization program. In 2015, Leslie and Clifford Hudson endowed the Hudson Fellows scholarship fund for select Ph.D. students at the University of Oklahoma College of Public Health. By 2018, the Hudsons increased their scholarship gifts to $5 million and the OU Board of Regents named the (now) Hudson College of Public Health in their honor.

Awards and honors
Hudson received the 2004 Silver Plate - Foodservice Operator of the Year Award from International Foodservice Manufacturers Association, and the 2000 Multi-Unit Foodservice Operators (MUFSO) Golden Chain Award from Nation's Restaurant News. He has been a guest on various national business programs including CNBC's Mad Money, Squawkbox and Power Lunch, as well as various Bloomberg news programs. In 2009, he was placed on the Foundation for Oklahoma City Public Schools Hall of Fame for his longstanding service. In 2001 Hudson received the University's Regent's Alumni Award from the University of Oklahoma and, in 2011, the University of Oklahoma conferred to him an honorary doctorate degree in humane letters as a “civic leader and supporter of education”.  The Georgetown University Alumni Association has also awarded him its highest honor, the John Carroll Award, in 2014.

References

External links
 Biography as Chairman and CEO of Sonic
 Website and book information

1954 births
Living people
American business executives
Northwest Classen High School alumni